Bartholomäus Bernardi (1487–1551) was the rector and a professor of physics and philosophy at the University of Wittenberg during the time of Martin Luther. He became a Protestant reformer. He was also pastor of the congregation in Kemberg, Saxony—15.2 kilometers (9.4 miles) south of Wittenberg— and the third (after Jacob Knabe of Danzig and Nicholas Brunner of Nesselbach) Lutheran priest to marry.

Bernhardi
Bernhardi